Cetengraulis mysticetus is a species of anchovy of the family Engraulidae. Its common names include pacific anchoveta.

References

Anchovies
Fish described in 1867
Taxa named by Albert Günther
Least concern biota of South America
Least concern biota of North America